The No TikTok on Government Devices Act is a United States federal law that prohibits the use of TikTok on all federal government devices.
Originally introduced as a stand-alone bill in 2020, it was signed into law as part of the Consolidated Appropriations Act, 2023 on December 29, 2022, by President Joe Biden.

Legislative history
The No TikTok on Government Devices Act was originally introduced in 2020 by Senator Josh Hawley (R-MO) and passed the United States Senate by unanimous consent on August 6, 2020. The bill was reintroduced on April 15, 2021 by Senator Hawley and it passed the Senate by unanimous consent again on December 14, 2022.

The bill was later included in the year-end omnibus spending bill as Division R of the Consolidated Appropriations Act, 2023, which then passed the Senate 68–29 on December 22, 2022 and the United States House of Representatives 225–201–1 on December 23, 2022, before being signed into law on December 29, 2022 by President Joe Biden.

Provisions
The law prohibits the download or use of TikTok on, and requires the removal of TikTok from, all federal government and government corporation devices. The law is effected by the Director of the Office of Management and Budget together with the Administrator of General Services, the Director of the Cybersecurity and Infrastructure Security Agency, the Director of National Intelligence and the Secretary of Defense. Exceptions may only be made for law enforcement, national security or security research purposes, if authorized.

Related state laws

As of January 2023, at least 28 (of 50) states have announced or enacted bans on state government agencies, employees and contractors from using TikTok on government-issued devices.

See also
 Censorship of TikTok

References

External links
 S. 1143 Senate bill text
 H.R. 2617 House bill text

2020s in Internet culture
Acts of the 117th United States Congress
Riders to United States federal appropriations legislation
TikTok